2009 LA Tennis Open USTA Men's Challenger may refer to:

2009 Home Depot Center USTA Challenger, part one of the event
2009 USTA LA Tennis Open, part two of the event